This is the complete list of Olympic medalists in modern pentathlon.

Current program

Men's individual

Women's individual

Discontinued event

Men's team

Athletes
The following table shows the most successful athletes in Olympic modern pentathlon by medals won:

References
International Olympic Committee results database

Modern pentathlon
medalists